Richard Mayo may refer to:

Richard W. Mayo (1902–1996), American modern pentathlete, brigadier general, and city manager
Richard Mayew (died 1516), also written Richard Mayo, Bishop of Hereford
Richard Mayo (minister) (1631–1695), nonconformist pastor
Richard Bourke, 6th Earl of Mayo (1822–1872)